Michael Gross   (1920 – 4 November 2004) was an Israeli painter, sculptor and conceptual artist.

Biography
Michael Gross was born in Tiberias in the British-administered Palestine in 1920. He grew up in the farming village of Migdal. In 1939-1940, he left to study at the Teachers’ Training College in Jerusalem. In 1939, while he was away, his father was murdered by Arabs, and the family farm and home were destroyed. This event impacted on his work as an artist.

From 1943 to 1945, he studied architecture at Technion – Israel Institute of Technology in Haifa.  From 1951 to 1954, he studied art at the École nationale supérieure des Beaux-Arts in Paris. He returned to Israel in 1954 and settled in the artists’ village of Ein Hod.

Artistic style
Gross's works are imbued with the light and spirit. They are minimalist, but never pure abstraction, always tied to natural form and laden with feeling. In his early paintings, Gross simplified form in order to concentrate on proportion, broad areas of color,  and the size and placement of each element. This reductive process was also notable in his sculptures, whether in painted iron or other materials such as white concrete. In later paintings, he often juxtaposed large off-white panels with patches of tone, adding textured materials such as  wooden beams, burlap and rope.  Gross’s rough, freely-brushed surfaces, along with the use of soft pastel coloring, conjure up images of the Israeli landscape.

Gallery

Education
 1936-1940 Teachers Seminary, Jerusalem
 1943-1945, Technion, Haifa, architecture, studied sculpture with Moshe Ziffer.
 1951-1954 Beaux Arts, Paris with Michel Gimond

Teaching
 1954 - 1954 Higher School of Education, Haifa.
 1957-1960 Bezalel Academy of Arts and Design, Jerusalem
 1960-1980 Oranim Art Institute, Tivon

Awards
 1964: Herman Struck Prize
 1967: Dizengoff Prize
  1971:  Gold Medal, São Paulo Art Biennial
  1977:  Sandberg Prize for an Israeli Artist, Israel Museum
  1987:  Minister of Education and Culture Prize for Painting and Sculpture
  1995 Gamzu Prize, Tel Aviv Museum
  2000:  Israel Prize for painting and sculpture.

Outdoor and public art 
 1974, Kiryat Hayovel (Simon Bolivar Park), Jerusalem
 1980, Kibbutz Messilot
 1982 To the victims of the sea, 1969, Tel Aviv University
 1985 Tel Aviv University
 1996 "Trio"- square of Tel Aviv Museum of Art

See also
 List of Israel Prize recipients
Visual arts in Israel

References

Further reading
  Michael Gross, Paintings and Sculpture, Haifa, Haifa Museum, 1964
  Michael Gross, Outdoor and Indoor Works, 1976-77, Jerusalem, Israel Museum, 1977
  Michael Gross, Recent Works , Jerusalem, Israel Museum, 2002, 
   Omer, Mordechai, Michael Gross, Tel Aviv, Tel Aviv Museum of Art, 1993
 Dorit Kedar, "A fine balance: Michael Gross and Micha Ulman" In Art In Israel Autumn 1989, Vol. 1, Number 3, Pg. 28-31.

External links 
 
 
 

1920 births
2004 deaths
Jews in Mandatory Palestine
Israeli Jews
People from Tiberias
Jewish painters
Israeli conceptual artists
Israeli contemporary artists
Modern sculptors
Technion – Israel Institute of Technology alumni
Israel Prize in sculpture and painting recipients
École des Beaux-Arts alumni
Sandberg Prize recipients
20th-century Israeli sculptors
20th-century Israeli painters
21st-century Israeli painters